The 1949 Dayton Flyers football team was an American football team that represented the University of Dayton as an independent during the 1949 college football season. In their third season under head coach Joe Gavin, the Flyers compiled a 6–3 record.

Schedule

References

Dayton
Dayton Flyers football seasons
Dayton Flyers football